Brussels (Armstrong Field) Airport  is located adjacent to Brussels, Ontario, Canada.

External links
 Page about this aerodrome on COPA's Places to Fly airport directory

References

Registered aerodromes in Ontario